AKS-452 is a COVID-19 vaccine candidate developed by Akston Biosciences.

References 

Clinical trials
Dutch COVID-19 vaccines
Protein subunit vaccines